On 27 January 2022, a mass shooting occurred at a Yuzhmash factory in Dnipro, Ukraine. Five people were killed and five others injured.

Shooting 
The killings occurred on 27 January 2022, at about 3:40 a.m. in the city of Dnipro, as guards began handing out weapons to the servicemen at Yuzhmash factory. A National Guard of Ukraine conscript armed with a reported AK-47 assault rifle shot dead four male servicemen and one civilian woman, and wounded five others. Two soldiers of the twenty-two soldiers present managed to escape and call an ambulance and policemen. The shooter fled the scene with his weapon. At about 9.30 am, he was detained in the town of Pidhorodne after he reported himself to the police.

Investigation 
The State Bureau of Investigation launched criminal proceedings against officials of the National Guard of Ukraine. 

The Ministry of Internal Affairs of Ukraine created a special investigative commission, which is authorized to establish the causes of the tragedy.

Accused 
According to law enforcement agencies, Artemiy Riabchuk, a National Guard of Ukraine serviceman from the Odessa Oblast, born in 2001, was the one who had shot at the servicemen. The State Bureau of Investigation informed the detainee of suspicion of murder, desertion, and theft of weapons. A possible terrorist motive is not to be ruled out.

According to one lawmaker, Riabchuk had been bullied in the past.

Aftermath 
As a result of the shooting, 5 people were killed and 5 others were seriously injured. Ukrainian President Volodymyr Zelensky condemned the shooting as "terrible" and extended messages of empathy to the victims' families. Over 40 National Guard members initiated a program to help victims receive blood donations.

Commander of the National Guard of Ukraine Mykola Balan resigned in response.

Judicial proceedings 
On January 28, 2022, the Kirovsky District Court of the city of Dnipro ordered Artemiy Ryabchuk to be detained without bail for a period of 60 days.

On March 11, 2022, Artemiy Ryabchuk's pretrial detention was extended until May 9, 2022.

Notes

References

Sources 
 The National Guard of Ukraine official website
 The Ministry of Internal Affairs of Ukraine official website
 The State Bureau of Investigations official website
 The investigation is considering several versions of the shooting at Yuzhmash, including illegal relations between servicemen

2022 murders in Ukraine
2022 mass shootings in Europe
2022 shooting
January 2022 crimes in Europe
Mass shootings in Ukraine
Yuzhmash
Mass murder in 2022
21st-century mass murder in Ukraine
January 2022 events in Ukraine